The common reed frog (Hyperolius viridiflavus) is a species of tree frogs in the family Hyperoliidae found in Burundi, the Democratic Republic of the Congo, Ethiopia, Kenya, Rwanda, Sudan, Tanzania, and Uganda, and possibly the Central African Republic, Chad, and Eritrea.
Its natural habitats are subtropical or tropical dry forest, subtropical or tropical moist lowland forest, subtropical or tropical moist montane forest, dry savanna, moist savanna, subtropical or tropical dry shrubland, subtropical or tropical moist shrubland, subtropical or tropical seasonally wet or flooded lowland grassland, subtropical or tropical high-altitude grassland, rivers, swamps, freshwater lakes, intermittent freshwater lakes, freshwater marshes, intermittent freshwater marshes, freshwater springs, arable land, pastureland, rural gardens, urban areas, heavily degraded former forests, water storage areas, ponds, irrigated land, seasonally flooded agricultural land, and canals and ditches.

Some evidence suggests that west African frogs may change sex from female to male after having successfully bred. Animals that switch sex as adults are known as sequential hermaphrodites because they have the gonads of either sex but at different periods of their lives. This contrasts with animals which are "simultaneous hermaphrodites" which have both gonads at the same point. However, this sequential hermaphroditism in reed frogs has only been noted once and in a captive colony; it is not generally accepted by scientists that this process occurs in amphibians. Despite a lack of evidence for hermaphroditism, the film Jurassic Park has become a cultural reason for why many believe that frogs can be sequential hermaphrodites.

References

Hyperolius
Amphibians described in 1841
Taxonomy articles created by Polbot